The John Scudder Property is a home in Savannah, Georgia, United States. It is located at 11 East Jones Street and was constructed in 1851.

The building is part of the Savannah Historic District, and in a survey for the Historic Savannah Foundation, Mary Lane Morrison found the building to be of significant status.

The house was built by and for John Scudder, one of the city's "most prolific and successful antebellum builders". It was later sold to Charles S. Hardee for $4,500. Scudder also built the property next door at  15 East Jones Street.

See also
Scudder's Row
Buildings in Savannah Historic District

References

Houses in Savannah, Georgia
Houses completed in 1851
Savannah Historic District